Problepsis deducta is a moth of the  family Geometridae. It is found on the Seychelles.

References

Moths described in 1962
Scopulini
Moths of Africa